The 2014 Valencian Community motorcycle Grand Prix was the eighteenth and last round of the 2014 Grand Prix motorcycle racing season. It was held at the Circuit Ricardo Tormo in Valencia on 9 November 2014.

In the MotoGP class, Valentino Rossi took his first pole position since the 2010 French Grand Prix. Rossi crossed the line in second place to take the runner-up spot in the championship, while the podium was completed by Dani Pedrosa. Further down the order, Jorge Lorenzo and Andrea Iannone took the decision to swap bikes – on lap 20 – as light rain fell. Both riders struggled to get the bike stopped in the uncertain conditions and dropped down the order; Iannone finished 22nd, while Lorenzo retired from the race. Utilising the new Suzuki GSX-RR, Randy de Puniet retired from the race before the halfway mark. Drive M7 Aspar rider, Hiroshi Aoyama, rode an Open-specification Honda RC213V-RS and finished in fifteenth place. The race was also the Gresini team's last race with Honda bikes ahead of their switch to Aprilia in 2015. It was also the final race for the PBM chassis, as their team will switch to the British Superbike Championship from 2015.

In the Moto2 race, Thomas Lüthi took his second victory of the season, after capitalising on a mistake by the world champion, Esteve Rabat, on the final lap to take the spoils. Rabat had been leading the race before missing a gear coming out of the final corner, and Lüthi was able to prevail by 0.133 seconds at the line. Rabat's second place did however, seal a record number of points scored for an intermediate class season. Johann Zarco completed the podium in third place, his fourth podium of the season. Aside from the race honours, the runner-up position in the final championship standings was decided by virtue of a collision between the two competitors battling for the position. Rabat's teammate Mika Kallio and Maverick Viñales both retired from the race, thus giving Kallio the position by 15 points.

The world title was decided in the final Moto3 race of the season, with a third-place finish for Álex Márquez enough to give him his first world title by two points, despite his title rival Jack Miller winning the race. In the process, he and his brother Marc Márquez became the first brothers to win world motorcycle racing titles. Splitting the title rivals in the finishing order was Isaac Viñales, taking his third podium of the season.

Classification

MotoGP

Moto2

Moto3

Championship standings after the race (MotoGP)
Below are the standings for the top five riders and constructors after round eighteen has concluded.

Riders' Championship standings

Constructors' Championship standings

 Note: Only the top five positions are included for both sets of standings.

References

2014 MotoGP race reports
Valencian Motorcycle Grand Prix
Valencian Community motorcycle Grand Prix
21st century in Valencia
Valencian motorcycle Grand Prix